The Close of the Collegiate Church of St Peter was an extra-parochial area, and later civil parish, in the metropolitan area of London, England. It corresponded to the area of Westminster Abbey and was an enclave between the parishes of St Margaret and St John, within the City and Liberty of Westminster. The Collegiate Church of St Peter is an alternative name for Westminster Abbey.

In 1875 it was added to the St George's Poor Law Union, which also included the parishes of St George Hanover Square, St Margaret and St John.

In 1889 the parish became part of the County of London and in 1900 it became part of the Metropolitan Borough of Westminster.

It was abolished as a civil parish in 1922.

References

History of local government in London (pre-1855)
History of the City of Westminster
Former civil parishes in London